Salim Beyg (also Romanized as Salīm Beyg) is a village in Dasht Rural District, Silvaneh District, Urmia County, West Azerbaijan Province, Iran. At the 2006 census, its population was 218, in 38 families.

References 

Populated places in Urmia County